William E. Hauter is a Republican member of the Illinois House of Representatives from the 88th district. In the 103rd General Assembly, Hauter will represent the 87th district. The 87th district includes parts of McLean and Tazewell counties in Central Illinois.

Early life and career
Hauter, a graduate of the University of Illinois College of Medicine, is a board-certified doctor in Emergency Medicine and Anesthesiology. In his medical career, he has been at variou times a partner at Associated Anesthesiologists; an emergency physician at OSF Saint Francis Medical Center, and an assistant clinical
professor at the Peoria campus of the University of Illinois College of Medicine. He was elected to the County Board in Tazewell County, Illinois, in the 2020 general election.

Illinois House of Representatives
On December 21, 2022, the 88th Legislative District Republican Committee appointed Hauter to the remainder of Representative Sommer's term. Hauter served from the 88th district for the remainder of the 102nd General Assembly. Upon being sworn in to the 103rd General Assembly, to which he was elected, he became the representative for the 87th district. Hauter was sworn into office on January 1, 2023.

Electoral history

2022
In the 2022 Republican primary, Hauter defeated Mary J. Burress, the Tazewell County Treasurer, and was unopposed in the 2022 general election.

References

Living people
Place of birth missing (living people)
People from Morton, Illinois
21st-century American politicians
Illinois Republicans
University of Illinois College of Medicine alumni
Physicians from Illinois
Year of birth missing (living people)